Caterina Volpicelli (21 January 1839 – 28 December 1894) was an Italian Roman Catholic professed religious and the foundress of the Maids of the Sacred Heart of Jesus.

On 29 April 2001 she received beatification from Pope John Paul II and was canonized as a saint of the Roman Catholic Church on 26 April 2009 in a celebration at which Pope Benedict XVI officiated.

Biography
Caterina Volpicelli was born in Naples January 21, 1839, to Peter and Teresa de Micheroux. Her family belonged to the Neapolitan high bourgeoisie and she had a deep Christian faith. After an adolescence spent loving theater, music, literature, and after a strong existential crisis, she began to gain awareness of being called to religious life. At first she thought that her vocation was for contemplative life, which she experienced, but she had had to leave due to her frail health. The priest Louis from Casoria helped her understand that she was called to live the evangelical counsels "remaining in the midst of society." She devoted herself to the diffusion of the Apostleship of Prayer with some assistants. Thanks to Father Ramière, Volpicelli encountered a French foundation that had her same objectives.

The French institution was aggregated to the new Congregation of the Missionaries of the Sacred Heart of Jesus by Jean Jules Chevalier. It was called the "Third Order of the Sacred Heart" and it was led by Louise-Thérèse de Montaignac. The archbishop of Naples, Sisto Riario Sforza, having understood that the nascent Neapolitan foundation had its own personality confronted with that of de Montaignac, established that the two institutions were to be separated. In 1874, Volpicelli's foundation received the approval of the archbishop of Naples and was named the "Pia Unione delle Ancelle del Sacro Cuore" (Pious Union of the Maids of the Sacred Heart).

However, Catherina felt the need to receive approval also from the Holy See.

The originality and the novelty of the form of her foundation, which desired to be recognized as an authentic religious institution with a public profession of vows, aroused many perplexities and open hostility, especially in the Roman ecclesiastic environment. The various difficulties were overcome, and in June 1890 the “Istituto delle Ancelle del Sacro Cuore di Gesù” (Institute of the Handmaids of the Sacred Heart of Jesus) obtained the Decree of Praise by the Sacred Congregation of Bishops and Regulars, without changing its innovative design. Caterina Volpicelli died on December 28, 1894, leaving great uncertainty in the young institution, which would have still needed her charismatic presence.

Veneration
She was declared Venerable on March 25, 1945 by Pope Pius XII. On June 28, 1999, John Paul II promulgated the Decree on the miracle obtained through her intercession. On 29 April 2001, the same pope proclaimed her Blessed. On December 6, 2008, Pope Benedict XVI signed the decree recognizing a miracle attributed to the intercession of the woman, a prelude to the process of canonization.

She was canonized in St. Peter's Square in Rome on April 26, 2009 by Pope Benedict XVI.

Her liturgical commemoration is on January 22. A plaque in her memory has been recently placed in 30 Port‘Alba Street in Naples where she was born; as a religious woman she gave a turn to the religious life of women.

References

1839 births
1894 deaths
Italian Roman Catholic saints
19th-century Neapolitan people
19th-century Italian Roman Catholic religious sisters and nuns
Beatifications by Pope John Paul II
Canonizations by Pope Benedict XVI